Taba or TABA may refer to:

Places
Burundi
Taba, Bururi
Taba, Songa

 Egypt
 Taba, Egypt, a town in Egypt near the Gulf of Aqaba
 Taba Border Crossing, a border crossing between Taba in Egypt and Eilat in Israel
 Taba Summit, a series of negotiations between Israel and the Palestinian Authority held in Taba, Egypt in 2001

 Rwanda
 Taba, Rwanda, a commune in Rwanda

Solomon Islands

Taba, Solomon Islands, a village in Guadalcanal, Solomon Islands

Others
 Languages
 Taba language, an Austronesian language spoken in the northern Maluku Islands of Indonesia

 Others
 The Taba Game, a game with Greek origins popular among Argentinian gauchos
 TABA – Transportes Aéreos Bandeirantes, a Brazilian airline from 1945 to 1950
 TABA – Transportes Aéreos da Bacia Amazônica, a Brazilian airline from 1976 to 1999